Hendrix Marion Fowler (February 13, 1918 – September 16, 2014) was an American politician. He served as a Democratic member for the 24th district of the Louisiana House of Representatives.

Fowler was born in Coushatta, Louisiana, the son of Zula Fair and Angus Jesse Fowler. He was the brother of Douglas Fowler, who was Louisiana elections commissioner. He attended Martin High School and Northwestern State University, leaving to serve in the United States Army in World War II. After his discharge he built a house for his parents.

Fowler was the mayor of Coushatta, Louisiana from 1951 to 1971. where he succeeded his brother Douglas. The following year he was elected for the 24th district of the Louisiana House of Representatives, serving until 1986.

Fowler died in September 2014, at the age of 96.

References 

1918 births
2014 deaths
People from Coushatta, Louisiana
Democratic Party members of the Louisiana House of Representatives
20th-century American politicians
Mayors of places in Louisiana
United States Army soldiers
Insurance agents
Northwestern State University alumni
Louisiana politicians convicted of crimes